

92001–92100 

|-id=097
| 92097 Aidai ||  || Ehime University, whose nickname is Aidai, is one of the 87 national universities in Japan. It was established in 1949 with the consolidation of four schools. Since the foundation of the Research Center for Space and Cosmic Evolution in 2007, Aidai has promoted the study of astronomy and cosmology. || 
|}

92101–92200 

|-bgcolor=#f2f2f2
| colspan=4 align=center | 
|}

92201–92300 

|-id=209
| 92209 Pingtang ||  || Pingtang County, situated in southwestern China in Qiannan Buyi and Miao autonomous prefecture, Guizhou province, has rich tourism resources, especially the world's best-preserved karst landform, providing a unique site for constructing FAST (the Five-hundred-meter Aperture Spherical radio Telescope) || 
|-id=213
| 92213 Kalina ||  || Antonín Kalina (1902–1990) was a Czech citizen who was imprisoned in Buchenwald concentration camp from 1939 to 1945. As a member of the Communist Underground he saved some 900 children and youths from dangers of daily life in the camp. In 2012 he was recognized as Righteous Among the Nations. || 
|-id=251
| 92251 Kuconis ||  || As the Executive Officer of MIT Lincoln Laboratory, John E. Kuconis (born 1951) provided outstanding leadership for Director's Office initiatives. He was responsible for community outreach, including outreach for the LINEAR program. || 
|-id=279
| 92279 Bindiluca || 2000 DG || Luca Bindi (born 1971) holds the Chair of Mineralogy and Crystallography at the University of Florence, Italy. He has received many national and international scientific awards, including the President of the Republic Prize 2015 of the Lincei Academy. He is renowned for the discovery of quasicrystals in nature. || 
|-id=297
| 92297 Monrad ||  || Ingrid "Twink" Monrad (born 1945) is a meteorite hunter in Tucson, Arizona. With Jim Kriegh and John Blennert, she is one of the co-discoverers of the Gold Basin Meteorite Strewn Field || 
|-id=300
| 92300 Hagelin ||  || Jerry Hagelin (born 1938) is well known throughout the state of Arizona for his selfless work with children as the state director of Child Evangelism Fellowship and as pastor of Desert Gardens Cumberland Presbyterian Church. || 
|}

92301–92400 

|-id=389
| 92389 Gretskij ||  || Andrej M. Gretskij (born 1945) is an associate professor at Kharkiv Karazin National University. He has been a pioneer in the study of the brightness-phase curve of Saturn's rings and is author of many astronomical textbooks. His lectures have had a big impact among students of astronomy in Ukraine || 
|}

92401–92500 

|-bgcolor=#f2f2f2
| colspan=4 align=center | 
|}

92501–92600 

|-id=525
| 92525 Delucchi ||  || Fausto Delucchi (born 1947) is a Swiss amateur astronomer in Vico Morcote. He shares his astronomical passion by showing the beauty of celestial objects to visitors at the public Calina Observatory in Carona. || 
|-id=578
| 92578 Benecchi ||  || Robert J. Benecchi (born 1966), husband of American discoverer Susan D. Kern, is a hardware design engineer who has contributed to the development of numerous wireless communication and medical device technologies. || 
|-id=579
| 92579 Dwight ||  || Edward (Ed) Joseph Dwight Jr. (born 1933) was the first African American astronaut candidate. He served in the US Air Force, working as test pilot before serving in the Aerospace Research Pilot School. After leaving the Air Force he went onto be a influential sculptor and author. || 
|-id=585
| 92585 Fumagalli ||  || Francesco Fumagalli (born 1958) is an Italian telescope maker and amateur astronomer who observes variable stars. He lives in Bregazzana di Varese. || 
|-id=586
| 92586 Jaxonpowell ||  || Jaxon Powell (born 2018) is the nephew of American amateur astronomer Loren C. Ball, who discovered this minor planet. || 
|}

92601–92700 

|-id=614
| 92614 Kazutami || 2000 QY || Kazutami Namikoshi (born 1938), who lives in Tokyo, Japan, with his wife Kyoko, is a friend of the discoverer Stefano Sposetti. || 
|-id=685
| 92685 Cordellorenz ||  || Francis Merritt Cordell and Philip Jack Lorenz, American astronomers after whom the Cordell–Lorenz Observatory at The University of the South in Sewanee, Tennessee, is named. Francis restored the 1897 Alvan Clark refractor and guided the renovation of the observatory's dome. Philip reintroduced the astronomy classes at the University and established the public observing program at the observatory. || 
|}

92701–92800 

|-bgcolor=#f2f2f2
| colspan=4 align=center | 
|}

92801–92900 

|-id=891
| 92891 Bless ||  || Robert Bless (1927–2015), was an American astronomer who served on the astronomy faculty at the University of Wisconsin in Madison from 1958 until 1995. An expert in stellar energy distributions, he taught and encouraged many astronomy graduate students, including the discoverer (Robert L. Millis), whose Ph.D. thesis research he advised (Src). || 
|-id=892
| 92892 Robertlawrence ||  || Robert H. Lawrence Jr. (1935–1967) was selected for the Manned Orbiting Laboratory (MOL) program. He was the first African American to be selected as an astronaut and was the only MOL astronaut with a doctorate. He perished in a plane crash before he had the opportunity to go to space. || 
|-id=893
| 92893 Michaelperson ||  || Michael J. Person (born 1970), a planetary scientist at the Massachusetts Institute of Technology. He specializes in occultation studies of small bodies in the outer solar system, especially Neptune's moon Triton, Pluto and Charon. || 
|-id=894
| 92894 Bluford ||  || Guion Steward Bluford Jr. (born 1942) was the first African American astronaut in space. He was a part of four missions between 1983 and 1992, which included deploying satellites, testing robotic arms, and conducting research. Bluford logged a total of 688 hours in space. || 
|}

92901–93000 

|-bgcolor=#f2f2f2
| colspan=4 align=center | 
|}

References 

092001-093000